Alison Wheeler (born 4 March 1972) is a British singer, best known as the female vocalist for The Beautiful South from 2003 until they disbanded in 2007.

Wheeler's career in music began at university in a cover band called Melt City, alongside Hal Ritson, now of The Young Punx, Kev Dowd, now of Lowbrow, James Woods, now of Jam Sandwich and Dom Wilhelm, (of 1990s UK pop punk act Satellite Beach). On arriving in London she joined indie band Junk, subsequently renamed Treehouse, well known on the Camden & Islington gig circuit (The Dublin Castle, Bull & Gate, the Laurel Tree, the Hope & Anchor, Islington).

In 1998 Wheeler responded to an audition for a "girl band" Virginia, masterminded by record producer Ian Shaw (founder of Warm Fuzz Records) and then consisting of Louise Miller and Lee Winnick, the latter shortly afterwards replaced by Laura Matthews.  Virginia featured repeatedly as guests on BBC Radio, particularly Janice Long, Jonathan Ross, Gyles Brandreth, Nicky Campbell and Ned Sherrin, as well as TV appearances in Northern Ireland on the Benny Hill Show.  Tracks from Virginia's first album Firstbite had chart success in the US Billboard charts.

In 2002 her work with London gospel band Citizen K led to an introduction to Dave Hemingway of the Beautiful South.  After working on Hemingway's as yet unreleased solo album, Hemingway promised a recommendation to the Beautiful South's driving force, Paul Heaton, since a new album was in the making, despite the unexpected departure of former band member Jacqui Abbott.  By 2003, with the release of "Gaze", Wheeler was a member of the band, appearing live first at a Carling Homecoming at the Welly Club in Hull on 18 September 2003.  Gaze was followed by albums "Goldiggas Headnodders and Pholk Songs" and "Superbi".

She was dubbed Alison 'Lady' Wheeler jokingly by her bandmates in The Beautiful South who felt that her demeanour and education at Trinity College, Cambridge, was in contrast to the band's trademark working-class northern image.

She remained busy during her pregnancy in 2005 touring the UK, headlining the acoustic stage at Glastonbury, in the Park and Oxygene. This was followed by nearly 50 gigs in 2006 including 2 UK tours, the V festival, an Irish tour and an American tour.

The band split in January 2007 due to "musical similarities". She spent some time enjoying motherhood and recorded a solo project.

The Beautiful South 

Members of Beautiful South (including Wheeler and singer Dave Hemingway but minus ex-lead singers Paul Heaton and Jacqui Abbott) got back together as The New Beautiful South (as a touring band rather than a recording act), which, in time, was re-branded as The South.

In 2010, she recorded the track "Move A Little Closer" with Jon Windle (formerly of Little Man Tate) for his debut solo album Step Out The Man. Since 2008, Wheeler has been working with Amanda Frolich recording children's albums for "Amanda's Action Club".

During 2012 and 2013, she toured the UK with The South, playing old Beautiful South songs as well as songs from her album with Dave Hemingway called Sweet Refrains.

Wheeler is currently still a member of The South though Dave Hemingway left the band in 2017.

References

British women singers
Alumni of Trinity College, Cambridge
1972 births
Living people
People from Daventry
21st-century British women singers